Bald Knob is a summit in West Virginia.

Bald Knob may also refer to:

Mountain summits
Bald Knob (Missouri), U.S.
Bald Knob (Franklin County, Virginia), U.S.

Populated places
Bald Knob, Queensland, Australia
Bald Knob, Arkansas, U.S.
Bald Knob, West Virginia, U.S.

Other uses
Bald Knob National Wildlife Refuge, a wildlife refuge in White County, Arkansas
Bald Knob Wilderness, a wilderness area in the Shawnee National Forest, Illinois
Bald Knob Cross, a large white cross in Alto Pass, Illinois

See also
Bald Knobbers, a 19th-century group of vigilantes in Missouri